Yvette Christiansë (born 12 December 1954) is a South African-born poet and novelist. She currently lives in New York City and teaches at Barnard College. She has also taught at Fordham University, also in New York City.

Biography
Yvette Christiansë was born in South Africa while it was still under Apartheid, and, despite poor access to education, was interested in language and becoming a writer from a young age. At the age of 18, she emigrated with her mother and sister to Mbabane in Swaziland, where she lived until 1973. Following the move to Swaziland, she and her family moved to Australia in order to place further distance between themselves and the South African government. In Australia, Christiansë attended the University of Sydney. She received a PhD in English from the school.

She is friends with filmmaker William Kentridge, a fellow South African.

Works
Christiansë's published work generally deals with South Africa, and contains post-colonial themes such as slavery and displacement.

She is the author of a novel entitled Unconfessed (Other Press, 2006; Kwela Books, 2007; Querido, 2007), and of the poetry collections Castaway (Duke University Press, 1999) and Imprendehora (Kwela Books/Snail Press, 2009). Imprendehora was a finalist for the Via Afrika Herman Charles Bosman Prize in 2010, and Castaway was a finalist in the 2001 PEN International Poetry Prize. Her novel, Unconfessed, was a finalist for the Hemingway Foundation/PEN Award for first fiction, and received a 2007 ForeWord Magazine BEA Award. It was also shortlisted for the University of Johannesburg Prize and the International Dublin Literary Award in 2008, and nominated for the Ama Ata Aidoo Prize 2010. Christiansë is the recipient of The Harri Jones Memorial Prize for poetry (Australia).

References 

South African women poets
South African women novelists
1954 births
Living people
University of Sydney alumni
Fordham University faculty
Barnard College faculty
21st-century South African novelists
20th-century South African poets
21st-century South African poets
20th-century South African women writers
21st-century South African women writers